The Principality of Liechtenstein is the last independent principality of the Holy Roman Empire. After the fall of the empire, Liechtenstein aligned itself with Austria-Hungary until the end of World War I. Since that time, Liechtenstein has been most closely aligned with its neutral neighbor Switzerland. The honours system of Liechtenstein is made up of an order of merit, established in 1937, and a limited number of commemorative medals that were awarded during the 20th century.

Orders
Order of Merit of the Principality of Liechtenstein (Fürstlich liechtensteinischen Verdienstorden).

Medals of orders
Princely Liechtenstein Medal of Merit (Fürstlich liechtensteinische Verdienstzeichen).

Decorations
Cross of Honour of Prince Johann II of Liechtenstein [1874] (obsolete).
Long-service awards of the Liechtenstein military.

Commemorative medals
Commemorative Medal for the Golden Jubilee of HSH Prince Johan II, 1908 (Fürstlich Liechtenstein'sche Jubiläums-Erinnerungs-Medaille).
Commemorative Medal for the 50th birthday of HSH Prince Franz Joseph II, 1956 (Gedenkmedaille zum 50. Geburtstag).
Commemorative Medal for the 70th birthday of HSH Prince Franz Joseph II, 1976 (Gedenkmedaille zum 70. Geburtstag).

References

Further reading

External links

 DÉCORATIONS du LIECHTENSTEIN (French), décorations in colour, including the plaque.
 Princely Liechtenstein Jubilee Commemorative Medal (Fürstlich Liechtenstein'sche Jubiläums-Erinnerungs-Medaille), 1908